Frank Herron (born July 9, 1994) is an American football defensive tackle who is a free agent. He played college football at LSU. He has also been a member of the New England Patriots, Seattle Seahawks, Tennessee Titans, Miami Dolphins, and Detroit Lions.

Professional career

New England Patriots
Herron signed with the New England Patriots as an undrafted free agent on May 11, 2018. He was waived on August 31, 2018.

Seattle Seahawks
On September 3, 2018, Herron was signed to the Seattle Seahawks' practice squad. He was released on September 12, 2018.

New England Patriots (second stint)
On October 8, 2018, Herron was signed to the New England Patriots' practice squad. Herron won Super Bowl LIII when the Patriots defeated the Los Angeles Rams 13-3. He signed a reserve/future contract with the Patriots on February 5, 2019. He was released on May 16, 2019.

Tennessee Titans
Herron signed with the Tennessee Titans on May 29, 2019. He was waived on August 31, 2019.

Detroit Lions
On September 27, 2019, Herron was signed to the Detroit Lions practice squad, but was released the next day.

Miami Dolphins
On October 24, 2019, Herron was signed to the Miami Dolphins practice squad.

Detroit Lions (second stint)
On December 10, 2019, Herron was signed by the Detroit Lions off the Dolphins' practice squad.

On September 5, 2020, Herron was waived by the Lions and signed to the practice squad the next day. He was elevated to the active roster on November 14 and November 21 for the team's weeks 10 and 11 games against the Washington Football Team and Carolina Panthers, and reverted to the practice squad after each game. He was signed to the active roster on December 5, 2020. On January 2, 2021, Herron was waived by the Lions.

Carolina Panthers
Herron signed with the Carolina Panthers on April 13, 2021. On May 10, Herron was released by the Panthers. He re-signed with Carolina on May 26. He was waived on August 31, 2021, and re-signed to the practice squad the next day. On October 30, Herron was suspended 2 games without pay for violating the NFL's policy on performance-enhancing substances. He signed a reserve/future contract with the Panthers on January 10, 2022.

On August 30, 2022, Herron was waived by the Panthers and re-signed to the practice squad on September 21. He was released on October 20.

References

External links
LSU Tigers bio
Detroit Lions bio

1994 births
Living people
Players of American football from Memphis, Tennessee
American football defensive linemen
LSU Tigers football players
New England Patriots players
Seattle Seahawks players
Tennessee Titans players
Detroit Lions players
Miami Dolphins players
Carolina Panthers players